The 1961 NCAA College Division football rankings are from the United Press International poll of College Division head coaches and from the Associated Press.  The 1961 NCAA College Division football season was the fourth year UPI published a Coaches Poll in what was termed the "Small College" division. It was the second year for the AP version of the poll, which only listed 10 teams.

Legend

The AP poll

The UPI Coaches poll

Notes

References

Rankings
NCAA College Division football rankings